The Volunteer Income Tax Assistance (VITA) grant program is an Internal Revenue Service (IRS) initiative in the United States that supports free tax preparation service for the underserved through various partner organizations.  

VITA service helps low- to moderate-income individuals, persons with disabilities, the elderly, and limited English speakers file their taxes each year. IRS awards matching funds to partner organizations throughout the country. The IRS awarded $18 million in grants for FY2019.

Description 
VITA was founded in 1971 by Gary Iskowitz at California State University, Northridge. 

Since the 1970s the program has grown to several thousand sites nationwide, partnering with non-profit organizations, local municipalities, and colleges and universities. In Tax Year 2015, 3.7 million VITA tax returns were filed with a 94% accuracy rate. VITA provides service to taxpayers making less than $60,000 per year.

Volunteers 
VITA volunteers include greeters, intake specialists, and tax preparers.  All volunteers must pass a code of conduct exam and an intake interview/quality review exam. 

The VITA tax returns are prepared by IRS tax law certified volunteers. The volunteers are taught how to use tax software and specific tax law each year. They must pass a tax law exam to receive basic or advanced certification. The passing score is 80%.  Certificates expire at the end of the tax year and must be renewed.  

VITA has other optional certifications.  These include certificates for Health Savings Accounts (HSA), Military personnel, International tax issues, Foreign Student returns, and Puerto Rico returns.  Some military bases participate in VITA with IRS agents training service members to complete military tax returns. Foreign students' returns are prepared at major public universities such as Arizona State University by more advanced experts.  

The complication of applying tax codes and the risk of being taken advantage of by paid tax preparation services is diminished with the presence of over 4,000 nation-wide VITA sites. One of the focal points of VITA is raising taxpayer awareness and receipt of the Earned Income Tax Credit (EITC) and Child Tax Credit (CTC). These two credits have a long history of poverty alleviation within the US, they originated during the 1970s War on Poverty in the Tax Reduction Act of 1975.  

As of 2017,  the Tax Cuts and Jobs Act contributed to the over complication of tax filing. The statistics researched by the non-profit Prosperity Now proves VITA to be a relevant necessity in poverty reduction. Today, tax preparation remains a highly unregulated industry and around 60% of all taxpayers turn to a paid preparation service. The longevity of the VITA program is dependent  on funding being approved and provided by Congress. The last official act to support the IRS initiative was made in 2017. The Volunteer Income Tax Assistance Permanence Act of 2017 that ensured low-income workers and under-served communities would gain assistance from VITA. Specifically, the bill “directs the Internal Revenue Service (IRS) to establish a Community Volunteer Income Tax Assistance Matching Grant Program to provide matching funds for the development, expansion, or continuation of tax preparation programs to assist low-income taxpayers and members of under-served populations.”

Tax law certification levels

VITA services 
There are also a number of tax topics that are "out-of-scope" for the program regardless of a tax preparer's certification. Even professionally licensed volunteers are prohibited from providing advice to taxpayers on out-of-scope topics in the capacity of a volunteer.

External links 

 grant program
 Pub 4671 provides the IRS VITA Grant overview and application instructions. 
 A list of current grantees here.
 Location look up

References

1) IRS 4012 VITA/TCE Volunteer Resource Guide (2) IRS 4491 VITA/TCE Training Guide (Includes content for Military Certification) (3) IRS 5157A VITA/TCE Affordable Care Act Taxpayer Scenarios (4) IRS 4942 VITA/TCE Specialty Course-Health Savings Accounts (HSA) (5) https://apps.irs.gov/app/vita/ (6) https://www.irs.gov/individuals/choose-your-tax-volunteer-role

 Newville, David, and Joann Ain. Leveraging Tax Time for Working Families with Vita ... Prosperity Now, July 2018, https://pndev.org/resources/leveraging-tax-time-working-families-vita.
 “IRS Tax Volunteers.” Internal Revenue Service, Oct. 2021, https://www.irs.gov/individuals/irs-tax-volunteers.
 Thomas L. Hungerford, Rebecca Thiess, September 25. (2013.). The earned Income Tax Credit and the Child Tax Credit: History, purpose, goals, and effectiveness. Economic Policy Institute. Retrieved November 2, 2021, from https://www.epi.org/publication/ib370-earned-income-tax-credit-and-the-child-tax-credit-history-purpose-goals-and-effectiveness/
 H.R.2901 - 115th Congress (2017-2018): Volunteer Income Tax Assistance Permanence Act of 2017." Congress.gov, Library of Congress, 18 April 2018, https://www.congress.gov/bill/115th-congress/house-bill/2901.

Personal taxes in the United States
Internal Revenue Service